WJKP-LD (channel 39) is a low-power television station licensed to Corning, New York, United States, serving the Elmira area as an affiliate of MyNetworkTV. It is owned by Coastal Television Broadcasting Company LLC alongside Fox affiliate WYDC (channel 48). Both stations share studios on East Market Street in Downtown Corning; WJKP-LD's transmitter is located on Higman Hill..

In addition to its own low-power digital signal, WJKP-LD also receives full-market over-the-air coverage on WYDC's second digital subchannel. This airs on channel 48.2 from the same Higman Hill transmitter.

Syndicated programming
Syndicated programming on WJKP-LD includes The Jerry Springer Show, The Wendy Williams Show, The People's Court, and TMZ among others.

External links

Television channels and stations established in 2003
2003 establishments in New York (state)
JKP-LD
Low-power television stations in the United States
MyNetworkTV affiliates